West Ukrainian National University, WUNU founded in 1971. It is located in the city of Ternopil, Ternopil Oblast, Ukraine.

Viktor Yushchenko, the president of Ukraine (2005–2010), is an alumnus of TNEU.

History
The university was founded in 1966, when the Department of Financial and Economic Faculty of Kyiv Institute of National Economy was opened in Ternopil. Within the years, the department was transformed into the faculty (1967), after that – into Financial and Economic Institute (1971), Institute of National Economy (1989), Academy of National Economy (1994). On March 30, 2005, the educational establishment became a university. On September 29, 2006, the national status was conferred to the university.

Campuses and buildings
Nowadays the TNEU complex includes 14 training and laboratorial complexes, a library, 4 sport gyms, 3 sports-grounds, 8 dormitories, 9 economic and service buildings.

Academic Departments by Faculty
 Faculty of Accounting and Audit;
 Faculty of Agricultural Economics and Management;
 Faculty of Banking Business;
 Faculty of Computer Informational Technologies;
 Department of Information Computing Systems and Control;
 American-Ukrainian School of Computer Sciences and Technologies;
 Faculty of Economics and Investment Management;
 Faculty of Economics and Management;
 Faculty of Finance;
 Faculty of International Business and Management;
 Faculty of Law;
 The Ukrainian-Dutch Faculty of Economics and Management;
 Faculty of Post-Graduate Studies.

International Activity

Participation in international organizations
 European Association of International Education (1999)
 European University Association (2007)
 Magna Charta Universitatum (2008)
 Talloires Network (from 2012)

Agreements with foreign partners
Cooperation with 52 foreign educational institutions is established (16 higher educational institutions of Poland; 7 – of Russia; 4 – of Germany; 3 – of Belarus, Italy, the USA; 2 – of Bulgaria, Kazakhstan, China; 1 – of Austria, Greece, Denmark, Canada, Lithuania, Moldova, the Netherlands, Spain, Romania, France).

Joint programs of cooperation with foreign partners
 German-speaking integrated program in Bachelor and Master training
 Ukrainian-American program in Bachelor training
 English-speaking program in International Economics and Tourism
 Ukrainian-Greek program in Master training in «Business administration»
 Program in training Bachelors and Masters on specialization «Crisis analysis and decision making»
 Ukrainian-Polish program in finances and insurance
 School of Polish and European Law
 Ukrainian-Dutch Faculty of Economics and Management
 Ukrainian-German Economic Faculty

Training of foreign students, post-graduates and doctoral students
Since 2007, 203 foreigners obtained certificates on graduation from the TNEU Preparatory Department for Foreigners; since 2006 foreign citizens were granted 62 Master Diplomas and 40 Bachelor Diplomas.

International programs and grants
Within the period of the last decade, TNEU participated in 35 international projects TEMPUS-TACIS, DAAD, APPOLO, «Marie Curie» etc.

External links 
 Ternopil National Economic University for admission
 Booklet
 List of universities in Ukraine

References

 Official site http://www.tneu.edu.ua

 
Universities and colleges in Ternopil
Educational institutions established in 1966
1966 establishments in Ukraine
National universities in Ukraine